Directorate of Government Accommodation (সরকারি আবাসন পরিদপ্তর) is a government directorate responsible for looking after government accommodations and state guest houses in Bangladesh and is located in Dhaka, Bangladesh. It is under the Ministry of Housing and Public Works.

History
In 1971 after the Independence of Bangladesh following the Bangladesh Liberation war, Directorate of Government Housing was created. The Central Estate Office in Dhaka, Estate Office in Dhaka, Regional Estate Office in Chittagong and the Rest Houses were merged into the directorate. On 9 November 1983 the four offices were separated and placed in the newly created Directorate of Government Accommodation. It manages the N.A.M. apartments which were constructed for the 2001 Nam (Non-Aligned Movement) conference in Dhaka but now is used to house Members of Parliament. The Directorate manages accommodations for government officers in Dhaka and Chittagong, Bangladesh.

References

Government departments of Bangladesh
Government agencies of Bangladesh
1983 establishments in Bangladesh
Organisations based in Dhaka